The 2008 Bucharest City Challenge was the sixth round of the 2008 FIA GT Championship season and was organised by City Challenge GmbH.  It took place at the Bucharest Ring temporary street circuit in Bucharest, Romania, on 23 — 24 August 2008.

Format
Unlike the previous running at Bucharest in 2007, the 2008 event introduced a new event format that involved two races.  After qualification, a one-hour race was held and entries were awarded half of the standard FIA points for their finishing positions.  On Sunday, a second one-hour race was held, with the starting grid being determined by the finishing order of the first race.  Half points were again rewarded based on finishing order.

Race results
Class winners in bold.  Cars failing to complete 75% of winner's distance marked as Not Classified (NC).

Saturday
Phoenix Carsport lead the field as the #5 Corvette of Swiss drivers Marcel Fässler and Jean-Denis Délétraz earned victory from pole position over the team's second car.  In the GT2 category, CR Scuderia earned their first ever victory in the FIA GT Championship, just ahead of defending class champions AF Corse.

Sunday
Phoenix Carsport continued their victorious run on Sunday as the #5 car once again led the field to the checkered flag, although the team's second Corvette failed to make the finish after hitting a wall with ten laps remaining.  CR Scuderia also won for the second time, Andrew Kirkaldy and Rob Bell's Ferrari overtaking the AF Corse Ferrari in the closing laps.

Statistics
 Pole Position – #5 Phoenix Carsport Racing – 1:15.348
 Average Speed (Race 1) – 
 Average Speed (Race 2) –

References

Bucharest
FIA GT Bucharest 2 hours